The 1976–77 Segunda División season saw 20 teams participate in the second flight Spanish league. Sporting de Gijón, Cádiz CF and Rayo Vallecano were promoted to Primera División. Pontevedra CF, Levante UD, CD San Andrés and Barcelona Atlètic were relegated to the new Segunda División B.

From this season, there is no relegation playoff.

Teams

Final table

Results

Pichichi Trophy for top goalscorers

External links 
  Official LFP Site

Segunda División seasons
2
Spain